James Wlcek (born February 22, 1964), sometimes credited as Jimmy Wlcek or Jim Wlcek, is an American actor born in New York City.

He began his acting career in 1986 with an episode of Tales from the Darkside. After his audition tape was sent to the producers of Ryan's Hope, he landed the role of Ben Shelby.

During the time he spent on Ryan's Hope he acted in the play Liars by Elliot Meyers directed by Shellen Lubin at the Producers Club Theatre. Eight months later, he was cast as Linc Lafferty on As the World Turns.  In 1997 he got the role of Trent Malloy in a two-hour Walker, Texas Ranger movie called Sons of Thunder. The role became a recurring one for Jimmy, who went on to guest star in several more episodes of the long-running series. In 1999, a spin-off series called Sons of Thunder was created with Jimmy in one of the lead roles.

Movies
 2019 High Moon as Deputy Grant
 2014 The Sector as Brennan
 2013 Shadow on the Mesa (TV Movie)  as Ranch Hand
 2011 Love's Christmas Journey as Landowner
 2009 Hydra as Bob Crick
 2005 Don't Tell as Yale
 2004 Little Black Book as Hockey Player
 1996 Damien's Seed as Eric
 1989 Steel Magnolias as Marshall Marmillion

Television
 2012 Blackout (TV series)  as Swat Commander 
 2003 The Division - Extreme Action Figures as Gym Owner
 2002 JAG - Odd Man Out as Petty Officer Second Class Terrence Shaw
 1999 Sons of Thunder as Trent Malloy
 1998-1999 Walker, Texas Ranger as Trent Malloy
 1997 L.A. Firefighters as The Big One
 1996 Baywatch Nights - Last Breath as Clancy
 1990-1992 As the World Turns as Lincoln 'Linc' Lafferty
 1989-1990 One Life to Live as Jack Gibson
 1987-1989 Ryan's Hope as Ben Shelby
 1987 Tales from the Darkside - The Swap as Claude Altoose

External links

Jimmy Wlcek on Facebook

1964 births
Living people
Male actors from New York (state)
American male stage actors
American male film actors
American male television actors